Finland competed at the 1984 Summer Olympics in Los Angeles, California, United States. 86 competitors, 73 men and 13 women, took part in 76 events in 15 sports.

Medalists

Archery

Defending gold medallist Tomi Poikolainen bettered his performance of four years earlier by one point, but with the return of the United States and Japan, Poikolainen's score was no longer sufficient to earn a medal and he fell to fifth place.  Much the same fate befell Päivi Meriluoto, who fell two places even though she shot 60 points better than she had in 1980.

Kyösti Laasonen, in his fourth Olympic archery competition, took 28th place.

Women's Individual Competition:
 Päivi Meriluoto — 2509 points (→ 5th place)
 Ama Rantal — 2460 points (→ 15th place)

Men's Individual Competition:
 Tomi Poikolainen — 2538 points (→ 5th place)
 Kyösti Laasonen — 2443 points (→ 28th place)
 Markku Syrjälä — 2333 points (→ 49th place)

Athletics

Men's 1,500 metres
 Antti Loikkanen
 Qualifying Heat — did not finish (→ did not advance, no ranking)

Men's 5,000 metres 
 Martti Vainio
 Heat — 13:45.16
 Semifinals — 13:30.48 (→ did not advance)
 Antti Loikkanen
 Heat — 13:51.47
 Semifinals — 13:58.74 (→ did not advance)

Men's 10,000 metres
 Martti Vainio
 Qualifying Heat — 28:19.25 
 Final — finished in second place (27:51.10), but was later disqualified for the use of several performance-enhancing drugs

Men's Marathon
 Pertti Tiainen — 2:17:43 (→ 27th place)
 Martti Vainio — did not finish (→ no ranking)

Men's 110 metres Hurdles
Arto Bryggare

Men's 3,000 metres Steeplechase
Tommy Ekblom

Men's High Jump
 Erkki Niemi
 Qualification — 2.24m
 Final — 2.24m (→ 9th place)

Men's Pole Vault 
 Kimmo Pallonen 
 Qualifying Round — 5.40m 
 Final — 5.45m (→ 5th place)

Men's Javelin Throw 
 Arto Härkönen 
 Qualification — 83.06m 
 Final — 86.76m (→  Gold Medal)
 Raimo Manninen 
 Qualification — 79.26m (→ did not advance, 13th place)
 Tero Saviniemi 
 Qualification — 76.46m (→ did not advance, 17th place)

Men's Shot Put
Aulis Akonniemi 
 Qualifying Round — 19.38 m
 Final — 18.98 m (→ 9th place)

Men's Hammer Throw 
 Juha Tiainen 
 Qualification — 72.68m 
 Final — 78.08m (→  Gold Medal)
 Harri Huhtala 
 Qualification — 73.78m 
 Final — 75.28m (→ 6th place)

Men's 20 km Walk
 Reima Salonen
 Final — did not start (→ no ranking)

Men's 50 km Walk
 Reima Salonen
 Final — 3:58:30 (→ 4th place)

Women's 100 metres
Helinä Laihorinne-Marjamaa

Women's 200 metres
Helinä Laihorinne-Marjamaa

Women's Marathon 
 Tujia Toivonen 
 Final — 2:32:07 (→ 10th place)
 Sinikka Keskitalo 
 Final — 2:35:15 (→ 15th place)

Women's 400m Hurdles 
 Tuija Helander
 Heat — 57.22 
 Semifinal — 56.59
 Final — 56.55 (→ 7th place)

Women's Discus Throw 
 Ulla Lundholm 
 Qualification — 56.44m
 Final — 62.84m (→ 4th place)

Women's Javelin Throw 
 Tiina Lillak 
 Qualification — 63.30m
 Final — 69.00m (→  Silver Medal)
 Tuula Laaksalo 
 Qualification — 60.42m
 Final — 66.40m (→ 4th place)
 Helena Laine 
 Qualification — 61.80m
 Final — 58.18m (→ 11th place)

Boxing

Men's Bantamweight (– 54 kg)
 Jarmo Eskelinen
 First Round — Defeated Yao Gaitor (Togo), 5-0
 Second Round — Lost to Juan Molina (Puerto Rico), 0-5

Canoeing

Cycling

Five cyclists represented Finland in 1984.

Individual road race
 Kari Myyryläinen
 Harry Hannus
 Patrick Wackström
 Harri Hedgren

Team time trial
 Harry Hannus
 Kari Myyryläinen
 Patrick Wackström
 Sixten Wackström

Individual pursuit
 Sixten Wackström

Diving

Men's 3m Springboard
Juha Ovaskainen
 Preliminary Round — 532.17
 Final — 548.55 (→ 11th place)

Equestrian

Judo

Modern pentathlon

Three male pentathletes represented Finland in 1984.

Individual
 Pasi Hulkkonen
 Jorma Korpela
 Jussi Pelli

Team
 Pasi Hulkkonen
 Jorma Korpela
 Jussi Pelli

Rowing

Sailing

Shooting

Swimming

Men's 100m Breaststroke
Martti Järventaus
 Heat — 1:06.21 (→ did not advance, 29th place)

Men's 200m Breaststroke
Martti Järventaus
 Heat — 2:26.96 (→ did not advance, 27th place)

Women's 100m Freestyle
Maarit Sihvonen-Vähäsaari
 Heat — 58.51 (→ did not advance, 18th place)

Women's 200m Individual Medley
Maarit Sihvonen-Vähäsaari
 Heat — 2:21.05
 B-Final — 2:19.27 (→ 9th place)

Weightlifting

Wrestling

References

Nations at the 1984 Summer Olympics
1984
S
Finnish-American culture in California